A chum is a temporary dwelling used by the nomadic Uralic (Nenets, Nganasans, Enets, Khanty, Mansi, Komi) reindeer herders of northwestern Siberia of Russia. The Evenks, Tungusic peoples, tribes, in Russia, Mongolia and China also use chums. They are also used by the southernmost reindeer herders, of the Todzha region of the Republic of Tyva and their cross-border relatives in northern Mongolia. It has a design similar to a Native American tipi but some versions are less vertical. It is very closely related to the Sami lavvu in construction, but is somewhat larger in size. Some chums can be up to thirty feet (ten meters) in diameter.

The traditional chum consists of reindeer hides sewn together and wrapped around wooden poles that are organized in a circle. In the middle there is a fireplace used for heating and to keep mosquitoes away. The smoke escapes through a hole at the top of the chum. The canvas and wooden poles are usually quite heavy, but could be carried by their reindeer. The chum is still in use today as a year-round shelter for the Yamal-Nenets, Khanty and Todzha Tyvan people of Russia.

In Russian use, the terms chum, yurt and yaranga may be used interchangeably.

In different languages it has different names: Nenets: ḿāʔ , Nganasan: maʔ, Khanty: (ńuki) χot. Evenki: ǯū .

References

External links
 https://web.archive.org/web/20070609160159/http://www.eth.mpg.de/subsites/siberia/researchers/stammler.html

Khanty
House types
Tents